Karl Koch is the name of:
 Carl Koch (director) (1892–1963), also spelled Karl Koch, German film director, writer
 Karl Koch (botanist) (1809–1879), German botanist
 Karl Koch (cyclist) (1910-1944), German cyclist
 Karl Koch (Fallschirmjäger) (1918–1944), member of the Fallschirmjäger during World War II and recipient of the Knight's Cross of the Iron Cross
 Karl Koch (hacker) (1965–1989), German computer hacker from the 1980s
 Karl Koch (born 1969), roadie and historian of the band Weezer
 Karl-Otto Koch (1897–1945), commandant of the Nazi concentration camp at Buchenwald
 Karl-Rudolf Koch (born 1935), German geodesist
 Karl Christian Koch (born 1952), Danish swimmer

See also 
 Carl Koch (disambiguation)